This article is about the list of Académica Petróleos do Lobito players.  Académica Petróleos do Lobito is an Angolan football (soccer) club based in Lobito, Angola and plays at Estádio do Buraco.  The club was established in 19770.

2020–2021
Académica Petróleos do Lobito players 2020–2021

2011–2020
Académica Petróleos do Lobito players 2011–2020

2001–2010
Académica Petróleos do Lobito players 2001–2010

1991–2000
Académica Petróleos do Lobito players 1991–2000

1979-1981
Académica Petróleos do Lobito players 1979-1981

External links
 Girabola.com profile
 Zerozero.pt profile
 Facebook profile
 Match schedule

References

Academica Petroleos Lobito
Académica Petróleos do Lobito players
Association football player non-biographical articles